John Weaver McMakin (March 6, 1878 – September 25, 1956), nicknamed "Spartanburg John", was an American left-handed pitcher. McMakin played for the 1900 and 1901 Clemson Tigers.  In Major League Baseball, he pitched in four games for the Brooklyn Superbas during the 1902 season, accumulating a record of 2-2 with a 3.09 earned run average. McMakin returned to Clemson to coach the team in the 1904 through 1906 seasons. Born in Spartanburg, South Carolina, he died at age 78 at his home near Lyman, South Carolina.

References

External links

Baseball Almanac

1878 births
1956 deaths
Baseball players from South Carolina
Clemson Tigers baseball players
Major League Baseball pitchers
Brooklyn Superbas players
Columbus Senators players
Clemson Tigers baseball coaches
Atlanta Crackers players
Montgomery Senators players
Spartanburg Spartans players
Baseball coaches from South Carolina
Sportspeople from Spartanburg, South Carolina
People from Lyman, South Carolina